Hans Carl Adolph von Carlowitz (25 March 1858 – 9 July 1928) served as a German army commander during the First World War.

Early life
Coming from an ancient noble family, Carlowitz studied rights at the Leipzig University. In 1879, he entered the Saxon army. From 1885 to 1888 Carlowitz studied at the Prussian military academy in Berlin and afterwards served on the Imperial German General Staff. By 1913, he had become Lieutenant general and in May 1914, he succeeded Max von Hausen as Minister of War of the Kingdom of Saxony.

First World War

Upon mobilization in August 1914, Carlowitz received command of the German XXVII Reserve Corps as a General of the Infantry. His Corps participated in the First Battle of Ypres, in which Carlowitz, without any previous battle experience, couldn't handle the stress. On 27 October he was relieved of command and sent on sick leave.
One month later he returned to service as commander of the 12th Reserve Division.
In August 1915, he was sent to the Russian Front at the head of the III Reserve Corps with which he fought against the Russian Lake Naroch Offensive.

In August 1917, he returned to the Western Front to lead the XIX (2nd Royal Saxon) Corps. He participated with success in the Battle of the Lys (1918), and became commander in August 1918 of the 9th Army until it was dissolved on 18 September 1918. He then took command of the 2nd Army, which fought against the Fourth British Army between Cambrai and Saint Quentin.

After the end of the war, he retired from the army. He died in 1928 and was buried in the Nordfriedhof (Dresden).
Esther von Kirchbach was one of his 4 children.

Sources 
SGV
Sachsen Digital
Deutsche kriegsgeschichte

1858 births
1928 deaths
Saxon generals
German Army generals  of World War I
Recipients of the Pour le Mérite (military class)
People from Riesa
Military personnel from Saxony